E. Glenn Wagner (born 1953) is the Chancellor of Oxford Graduate School. From 1997 to 2004, Wagner was senior pastor of the Calvary Church in Charlotte, N.C. before resigning due to plagiarism.

References

External links
Wagner, E. Glenn, and Gruen, Dietrich, Strategies for a Successful Marriage: A Study Guide for Men: Promise Keepers NavPress Publishing Group (1994) 
The awesome power of shared beliefs, World Pub. (1995), 9780849912139
Escape from Church, Inc.: The Return of the Pastor-Shepherd, Zondervan (2001), 

Living people
Heads of universities and colleges in the United States
Year of birth missing (living people)